"Invitation to Your Party" is a single by American country music artist Jerry Lee Lewis. Released in July 1969, it was the first single from his album The Golden Cream of the Country. The song peaked at number 6 on the Billboard Hot Country Singles chart. It also reached number 1 on the RPM Country Tracks chart in Canada.

Chart performance

References

1969 singles
Jerry Lee Lewis songs
Sun Records singles
1969 songs